Sigurveig Jónsdóttir (10 January 1931 - 3 February 2008) was an Icelandic actress. She appeared in more than fifteen films from 1980 to 2001.

Selected filmography

Death 
Sigurveig Jónsdóttir died of natural causes on 3 February 2008.

References

External links 

1931 births
2008 deaths
Icelandic film actresses